is a Japanese sprinter who specialized in the 200 metres. He competed at the 2007 World Championships reaching the quarterfinals. He also won a bronze medal at the 2007 Universiade.

Personal best

International competition

References

External links

Kamiyama Tomoya at JAAF 

1988 births
Living people
Japanese male sprinters
Sportspeople from Tochigi Prefecture
World Athletics Championships athletes for Japan
Universiade medalists in athletics (track and field)
Universiade bronze medalists for Japan
Medalists at the 2007 Summer Universiade
20th-century Japanese people
21st-century Japanese people